Isoko North is one of two Local Government Areas (LGA) in the Isoko region of Delta State, southern Nigeria – the other being Isoko South. The population of Isoko North was approximately 112,000 as of 2003. Its headquarters are in the town of Ozoro which has 14,000 seater capacity Olympic size stadium at the Delta State Polytechnic Ozoro. There are 13 Electoral Wards in the Local Government Area. Major towns in Isoko North are Ozoro, Owhelogbo, Otor Owhe, Oghara-Iyede and Emevor. The people are mostly Christian and traditional worshippers. Isoko North contains oil producing regions, and is the location of some of the recent conflict in the Niger Delta.

Towns and villages
Emevor
Oghara-Iyede
Owhelogbo
Oyede
Ellu
Ovrode
Iyede
Ofagbe
Okpe-Isoko
Ozoro
Bethel
Akwewhe
Otor-igho
Azairo owhe
Aradje
Igbuku

Notable people
Tim Owhefere, Nigerian politician

References

Isoko-north Local Government Area
Isoko Youths  seize Shell Oil  flow  station

Local Government Areas in Delta State